List of Blu-ray manufacturers may refer to:
 List of Blu-ray player manufacturers
 List of Blu-ray disc manufacturers